The second cabinet of Lebanon was formed on 5 May 1927, headed by Bechara El Khoury after the Prime Minister-designate Mohammad al-Jisr stepped down. It won the confidence with the consensus of both the parliament and the senate in 14 May. On 5 January 1928, El Khoury resigned.

Composition

References 

Cabinets established in 1927
Cabinets disestablished in 1928
Cabinets of Lebanon